Chrysocraspeda eclipsis is a species of moth of the  family Geometridae. It is found in eastern Madagascar.

This species has a wingspan of 29 mm. Forewings are dark grey, tinged with vinaceous, head and body are concolorous with the wings.

References

Sterrhinae
Moths described in 1932
Lepidoptera of Madagascar
Moths of Madagascar
Moths of Africa